The Ministry of Transport and Communications of Ethiopia is a department of the executive branch of the Government of Ethiopia. It was formerly known as the Ministry of Transport. Dagmawit Moges is serving the current Minister since 2018.

History 
Modern service delivery of transport emerged for the first time during the regime of Emperor Menelik II. After the invading Italian army was driven out of Ethiopia, an office known as "Ministry of Works and Communications" is formed to lead the service of transport and communications by Proclamation No 1/1953 promulgated to define powers and duties of the ministries.

After staying until 1966, the communications sector was detached from this Ministry with order No 46/1966 and established bearing the name "Ministry of Communications". In 1970, the Ministry of Communications, Telecommunication and Post” was established so as to supervise transport and communication services in the centralized manner. Then, in 1974, the name was changed to "Ministry of Communication and post" and after a couple of years (in 1976); it was again renamed "Ministry of Transport and Communications".
The ministry merged with the sector of construction and energy and named "Ministry of Infrastructure" in 2001 with Proclamation No 256/2001. Once again it gained its name "Ministry of Transport and Communication" with proclamation No 471/2005.

Structure 
After delaying until 2011, the communication sector was detached from the Ministry with order No. 691/2011 and established bearing the name "Ministry of Transport" changed with the supervision and coordination of eleven institutions of transport sectors:
 Ethio-Djibouti Railways
 Ethiopian Airports Enterprise 
 Ethiopian Airlines 
Ethiopian Civil Aviation Authority 
 Ethiopian Road Transport Authority
 Ethiopian Railway Corporation 
 Dry Port Administration 
 Maritime Affairs Authority
 Ethiopian Road Authority (ERA):- to be spitted:
 Office of Road Fund Agency 
Insurance Fund office

Power and duties 
In its field of activity the Ministry of Transport functions:
 Initiate policies and laws, prepare plans and budgets, and upon approval implement same

 Ensure the enforcement of federal laws
 Undertake study and research, collect, compile and disseminate information
 Provide assistance and advice to Regional States, as necessary
 Enter into contracts and international agreements in accordance with the law
 Direct and coordinate the performance of the executive organs made accountable to it; review their organizational structures, working programs, and budgets, and approve their submission to the appropriate government organs
 Supervise the public enterprises made accountable to it, and ensure that they operate as development catalysts
 Submit periodic performance reports to the prime Minister and the Council of Ministers 
 Promote the expansion of transport services
 Ensure that provisions of transport services are in line with the country's development strategy and have equitable regional distribution
 Ensure the integrated provision of transport services;
 Cause the formation and implementation of regulatory frameworks to ensure the provision of reliable and sage transport services
 Regulate maritime and transit services
 Follow-up the activities of the Ethio-Djibouti Railways in accordance with the agreement between the two countries.
 Ensure that transport infrastructures and constructed, upgraded and maintained

References

External links 
 Official web site
 Official website in English

Government of Ethiopia